Vladěna Pustková (born 11 July 1992) is a Czech ski jumper. She participated in the FIS Ski Jumping Continental Cup between the 2004–05 and 2011–12 seasons, before moving up to the FIS Ski Jumping World Cup, which she contested in 2011–12, 2012–13 and 2013–14. She was part of the Czech team which finished last in the FIS Nordic World Ski Championships 2013 – Mixed team normal hill event.

References

External links
 Profile at ladiesskijumping.com

1992 births
Living people
People from Frýdek-Místek District
Czech female ski jumpers
Universiade medalists in ski jumping
Universiade bronze medalists for the Czech Republic
Competitors at the 2015 Winter Universiade
Sportspeople from the Moravian-Silesian Region